During the 1949–50 season Hearts competed in the Scottish First Division, the Scottish Cup, the Scottish League Cup and the East of Scotland Shield.

Fixtures

Friendlies

East of Scotland Shield

Penman Cup

League Cup

Scottish Cup

Scottish First Division

See also
List of Heart of Midlothian F.C. seasons

References

Statistical Record 49-50

External links
Official Club website

Heart of Midlothian F.C. seasons
Heart of Midlothian